Senate elections were held in Turkey on 14 October 1973. In this election 52 members of the Senate were elected; 50 members for one-third of the Senate and two vacant seats.

Results

References

Turkey
Turkey
Senate
Senate elections in Turkey